Coralloconchus is a genus of cornulitid tubeworms with small, slender, irregularly
curved conical tubes with slowly increasing diameter. Tubes have thin walls and a smooth lumen. Tube wall has a lamellar
microstructure. Tubes are devoid of septa and vesicles in the adult part and are not spirally coiled.

References

External links
  Coralloconchus at the Paleobiology Database website.

Tentaculita
Silurian animals
Prehistoric life of Europe